Paul Williams (born July 27, 1981) is an American former professional boxer who competed from 2000 to 2012. He held the WBO welterweight title twice between 2007 and 2008, the WBO interim junior middleweight title in 2008, and challenged once for the unified middleweight title in 2010. Nicknamed "The Punisher", and standing at a height of 6 feet 2 inches, Williams was unusually tall for the three divisions in which he competed. His career was cut short in 2012 after a motorcycle accident left him paralyzed from the waist down.

Professional career

Early years at welterweight 
His debut was in the year 2000. He is promoted by the Goossens. In 2005 he outpointed former Olympic bronze medalist Terrence Cauthen and, later that year, he knocked out Alfonso Sanchez in 5 rounds.
His ESPN debut was a second-round knockout of Sergio Rios on Wednesday Night Fights. Williams made his HBO debut against then-undefeated Walter Matthysse, winning by a tenth-round technical knockout. That was followed by a victory over former junior welterweight world champion Sharmba Mitchell. He knocked Mitchell down three times en route to a fourth-round TKO.

WBO Welterweight Championship 

Williams became the mandatory challenger for WBO Welterweight Champion Antonio Margarito. The match took place July 14, 2007, in Carson, California, at the Home Depot Center with Williams winning a unanimous decision in which turned out to be a close fight where Williams' seemingly stronger finish seemed to seal him the decision victory in the eyes of boxing experts and fans alike.
Williams fought Carlos Quintana on February 9, 2008, in his first defense of his title. Williams lost to Quintana by decision in what many considered a minor upset.

Williams and Quintana had a rematch at the Mohegan Sun Arena in Uncasville, Connecticut on June 7, 2008, for the WBO Welterweight title, at Williams' request. Williams got off to a quick start when a left hand sent Quintana into a daze as several follow-up barrages put Quintana down. He got up, but Williams opened up with dozens of unanswered punches as the referee jumped in to stop the fight while Quintana was going down again.

Williams was rumored to be moving up two weight classes to fight Kelly Pavlik for the WBC Middleweight title but instead Pavlik himself decided to move up two weight classes himself to fight Bernard Hopkins. Williams fought Andy Kolle on September 25. Williams dominated the fight from the start and recorded a first-round knockout in 1:37 seconds.

Light Middleweight 
After failing to secure another meaningful contest at welterweight, Williams vacated his WBO welterweight title in order to fight Verno Phillips for the WBO Interim Light Middleweight title.

On November 29, 2008, Williams defeated Phillips by way of TKO after 8 rounds after the Doctor stopped the fight. In doing so he secured the WBO Interim Light Middleweight title.

Middleweight

Winky Wright 
Williams fought Winky Wright on April 11, 2009, in a 12-round middleweight bout featured on HBO. Williams defeated Wright in a unanimous decision which was not close on the scorecards – two of the three judges gave Williams all but one round while the third scored all 12 rounds for Williams.

Williams was then preparing to fight Middleweight Champion Kelly Pavlik in a bout scheduled to take place on October 3, 2009, in Atlantic City, New Jersey. The bout was postponed when it was discovered Pavlik had a staph infection in his knuckle and had been rescheduled for December 5. However, the bout was called off for a second time six weeks prior to the fight because Pavlik's infection had not completely healed.

Sergio Martínez 
On December 5, 2009, Paul Williams fought Sergio Martínez in a war of a twelve-round main event. In the first round Martinez was knocked down due to bad balance and a grazing left hand that landed just below the ear. In the final seconds of the 1st round though Martinez scored a knockdown of his own over Williams. The next two rounds were heavily in Martinez's favor as he hit Williams with barrages of counter punches. After Martinez was seemingly won the first 3 rounds, rounds 4-7 showed Williams coming back effectively landing hard lefts to the head of Martinez. In rounds 8-10 Martinez again confused Williams with using different varieties of punches, including straight lead lefts to the body followed by right hooks to the head and straight lefts to the face. The final 2 rounds showed much fatigue in Martinez and Williams but both warriors fought through to the end, although Williams seemed to win both of the last 2 rounds by being the far more active boxer (while the punching exchanges were very closely contested during those final 2 rounds as well), which would ultimately prove to be the difference and as a result of having far superior activity during those final 2 rounds, Williams won a close majority decision over Martinez. The judges scored the fight 114–114, 115–113 for Williams and 119–110 for Williams, thus making Williams emerge as the majority decision winner.

Kermit Cintron 
After his close win over Sergio Martínez, Paul Williams moved on to face Puerto Rican prospect Kermit Cintrón. The two met on May 8, 2010, Live on Saturday Night HBO Boxing. In the fourth round, Kermit Cintron fell out of the ring unintentionally and was not allowed to continue fighting due to hitting the arena floor. Williams was ahead on two of the three judges' scorecards at the time of the stoppage and was declared the winner by split technical decision. Cintron, who believed he should have been ahead on the scorecards, filed a complaint to have the ruling changed to a no-contest, claiming he was not given the five-minute recovery time allowed under California rules.

Williams vs Martinez II 

A highly anticipated rematch with Sergio Martinez eventually materialized at Boardwalk Hall, Atlantic City, New Jersey on November 20, 2010. Upon the Williams camp's insistence, the fight was contested at the catchweight limit of 158 pounds instead of the middleweight limit of 160, with Martinez's WBC Middleweight title on the line. The fight was billed as a potential "fight-of-the-year," however the fight ended abruptly and dramatically when Sergio Martínez delivered a knockout blow with 2:02 left in the 2nd round. The punch was a short left cross that caught Williams right on the chin as he attempted to deliver a left-hand of his own. Williams' right hand was at his waist when the punch landed, rendering Paul Williams unconscious upon contact.

Erislandy Lara 
On  July 9, 2011, Paul Williams fought in a light middleweight contest in Atlantic City against former Cuban amateur sensation Erislandy Lara. Throughout the fight, Lara repeatedly hit Williams with hard left hands and appeared to have won the fight convincingly in the eyes of the HBO crew and those sitting at ringside. However, the judges awarded Williams with a narrow majority decision, a highly controversial verdict that ultimately led to the suspension of the three judges by the New Jersey Athletic Control Board.

Motorcycle accident and paralysis 
On May 27, 2012, Williams was severely injured when he crashed his motorcycle in Georgia. He swerved to avoid hitting a car while traveling at about 75 mph on the motorcycle and was launched sixty feet. Witnesses say he landed on his head and his body "folded like a suitcase." The accident left him with part of his spinal cord severely bruised, paralyzing him from the waist down. Since it was bruised and not severed, it gives him a chance to regain sensation. The doctors told Williams the swelling could go down in a year or two, potentially giving him a chance of walking again. The accident came as Williams was preparing for his PPV main event against Canelo Álvarez on September 15. "I'm just chilling in a wheelchair because I got tired of walking," Williams said in an interview with Jim Gray on Showtime Championship Boxing on the day he was supposed to fight. "Whether I am walking or not walking, my game ain't over until the Lord takes my life."

Professional boxing record

References

Video references

External links 

1981 births
Boxers from South Carolina
Living people
Southpaw boxers
World Boxing Organization champions
Light-middleweight boxers
Middleweight boxers
Boxers from Augusta, Georgia (U.S. state)
American male boxers
People with paraplegia
World welterweight boxing champions